Hans Drakenberg (4 February 1901 – 1 November 1982) was a Swedish épée fencer. He won a silver medal in the team event at the 1936 Summer Olympics and finished fourth individually. Drakenberg won an individual European title in 1935 and two silver and five bronze medals at European and world championships in 1933–49. In 1935 he was awarded the Svenska Dagbladet Gold Medal.

Awards and decorations
  Swedish Fencing Federation Honorary Shield (Svenska fäktförbundets hederssköld) (1973)

References

External links
 

1901 births
1982 deaths
Swedish male épée fencers
Olympic fencers of Sweden
Fencers at the 1936 Summer Olympics
Olympic silver medalists for Sweden
Olympic medalists in fencing
Sportspeople from Stockholm
Medalists at the 1936 Summer Olympics
20th-century Swedish people